is a logic-based puzzle that has similarities to Sudoku and Minesweeper. The objective is to locate 12 hidden 'Holes' on an 8×8 grid. The board contains a variable number of arrows, each of which points to at least one Hole. A count of the number of Holes is given for each Row and Column.

Originally appearing in Japanese puzzle magazines, Shinro was popularized by its appearance in Southwest Airline's Spirit Magazine. It has since spawned web-based and iPhone versions.

Name 
New York-based puzzle-writing company Puzzability has been credited with coining the name Shinro in 2007.  The name  translates to "compass bearing", referring to the arrows that point towards the Holes.

Availability 
Websites:
Southwest Airlines Spirit Magazine, Fun and Games section Downloadable PDF with four puzzles
Shinropuzzles website Printable puzzles with solutions
Sternenhimmel (Babelfish translation) German variation where each arrow points to only one Hole
 Evolutionary Algorithm for Generation of Entertaining Shinro Logic Puzzles by David Oranchak
 playshinro.com online Shinro games

iPhone:
Shinro Mines
Jabeh with video tutorial
Sudoku Shinro

Android:
Shinro: Minefield

See also 
Logic puzzle

Notes

External links 
Shinro tutorial
Downloadable puzzles, Shinro tutorial, and a book

Puzzle video games
Logic puzzles